Fightland (2022) was a professional wrestling supercard event produced by Major League Wrestling (MLW). It took place on October 30, 2022, at the 2300 Arena in Philadelphia, Pennsylvania. It was the fourth event in the Fightland chronology, and served as a television taping for MLW Fusion. Other matches from the event aired as part of MLW's new flagship series, MLW Underground Wrestling, which premiered on February 7, 2023.

Production

Background
On August 15, 2022, MLW announced that Fightland will take place on October 30 at the 2300 Arena in Philadelphia.

Storylines
The show features several professional wrestling matches that result from scripted storylines, where wrestlers portray villains, heroes, or less distinguishable characters in the scripted events that build tension and culminate in a wrestling match or series of matches.

Through MLW's "Open Door Policy", several free agents would appear at the event. This includes Willie Mack and former MLW World Middleweight Champion Lio Rush. On October 7, MLW announced the signing of Sam Adonis, who will make his MLW debut at Fightland. On October 11, it was announced that Davey Boy Smith Jr. would return to the company at the event. On October 18, Ring of Honor (ROH) veteran Delirious was announced for Fightland. On October 25, independent middleweight wrestler Alec Price was announced for Fightland.

At Battle Riot IV, Alexander Hammerstone retained the MLW World Heavyweight Championship against Richard Holliday in a falls count anywhere match. After the match, Hammerstone would be confronted by MLW World Tag Team Champion EJ Nduka, who was looking to get the next shot at the title. Hammerstone would accept, but would later be attacked by Nduka, who had turned heel for the first time since arriving in MLW. The attack ended when Nduka put Hammerstone through a table. Their rivalry continued at Super Series, where Nduka jumped Hammerstone after the latter's match against Bandido, and then Hammerstone returned that favor after Nduka's match. On October 6, MLW announced on their website that Hammerstone and Nduka will face off for the title in a last man standing match.

Results

References

External links
Major League Wrestling official website

Events in Philadelphia
2022 in professional wrestling
Major League Wrestling shows
October 2022 sports events in the United States
Professional wrestling in Philadelphia